The Commissioner of the Independent Commission Against Corruption heads the body that is responsible for investigating and prosecuting corruption in both the public and private realms in Hong Kong. The ICAC was created in 1974 to deal with the corruption then endemic in Hong Kong's government departments and disciplined services.

List of office holders
All ICAC commissioners have been appointed from the ranks of Hong Kong's civil service or, prior to 1997, from among colonial officials.

Appointment controversies 
In October 2006, the appointment of Fanny Law as ICAC Commissioner was not well received. The unpopular Permanent Secretary for Education and Manpower was seen as weak on security-related issues. In addition, as Law's and Raymond Wong's appointments were a direct swap, the government was derided by the Civic Party and Liberal Party for belittling an important position by playing "musical chairs". Law was not perceived to be at the end of her civil service career, when the post of Commissioner was traditionally a 'final' posting, allowing the official to work without fear or favour.

References

External links 
 ICAC website

Positions of the Hong Kong Government
Law enforcement in Hong Kong